Promachoteuthis sloani is a species of squid from the northern Atlantic Ocean. It is known from only three specimens and very little is understood of its biology. P. sloani is characterised by several morphological features: nuchal fusion is absent between the head and mantle, the arms generally bear 3–4 series of suckers, and papillae are present on the tentacles.

The holotype is an immature female of 58 mm mantle length (ML) in near-perfect condition. The paratype, also an immature female, is larger at 102 mm ML. Both were trawled in nets that fished to depths greater than 2,650 m.

References

Toll, R.B. 1982. The comparative morphology of the gladius in the Order Teuthoidea (Mollusca: Cephalopoda) in relation to systematics and phylogeny. Ph.D. dissertation, University of Miami, 390 pp.
Voss, N.A. 1992. Family Promachoteuthidae. Smithsonian Contributions to Zoology 513: 183–185.
Toll, R.B. 1998. The gladius in teuthoid systematics. Smithson. Contributions Zool. 586: 55–68.

External links
Tree of Life web project: Promachoteuthis sloani
Promachoteuthis sloani: Description Continued

Squid
Molluscs described in 2006